Euthynnus is a genus of ray-finned bony fish in the family Scombridae, or mackerel family, and in the tribe Thunnini, more commonly known as the tunas.

Species list

See also
 List of prehistoric bony fish

References

External links

 
Marine fish genera
Taxa named by Christian Frederik Lütken